Alicia Terzian (born 1 July 1934) is an Argentine conductor, musicologist and composer of Armenian descent.

Biography
Alicia Terzian was born in Córdoba, Argentina. She studied at the National Conservatory of Buenos Aires under Alberto Ginastera, Gilardo Gilardi, Roberto García Morillo and Floro Ugarte. She received a degree in piano in 1954 and a degree in composition in 1958. In 1962 she continued her studies in electronic music and medieval Armenian church music with Father Leoncio Dayan at the Mekhitarist Monastery of San Lazzaro degli Armeni, Venice.

After completing her studies, Terzian taught music in Argentina at the National Conservatory, the Municipal Conservatory of Buenos Aires, the Universidad Nacional de La Plata and at the Art Institute of the Teatro Colón. She founded the Fundación Encuentros Internacionales de Música Contemporánea (EIMC) festival in 1968 and the Grupo Encuentros in 1979. Terzian has served as a member of the Music Council of UNESCO, is Vice President of the International Women's Council of UNESCO, Vice-President of the Argentine Composers Association, general secretary of the Argentine Society for Musicology, founder of the Latin-American Music Council.

Honors and awards
First Prize, Municipality of Buenos Aires City (1964)
Francisco Solano Award (1968)
Argentine Outstanding Young Musicians Prize (1970)
National Fund for the Arts Prize (1970)
First National Prize of Music (1982)
Gomidas International Prize (1983)
Academic Palms Medal, Government of France
Saint Sahak and Saint Mesrop Medals from Pope Vasken I of the Armenian Church (1992)
Alberto de Castilla Medal of Colombia (1994)
Mozart Medal, International Music Council (1995)

Works
Selected works include:
Tres Canciones after Byron 1954
 Libro de Canciones de Lorca, voice and piano
 1. Tres retratos, 1954
 2. Canciones para niños, 1956
 Tres piezas, op.5, string quartet, 1954
1. Canción del atardecer
2. Pastoral con variaciones
3. Danza rústica
Concierto for orchestra and violin, 1954
Movimiento Sinfónico, 1956
Primera Sinfonía, 1957
Oración de Jimena aria for soprano and orchestra, 1957
Escena lírica for soprano, tenor, bass and orchestra, 1957
Recitativo Dramático del Mensajero for bass and orchestra, 1957
Tres Madrigales for women's choir a cappella, 1958
Cantata de la tarde, 1958
Introducción y cantico de primavera, 1958
Movimientos contrastantes, 1964
Hacia la luz, ballet, 1965
Padre Nuestro y Ave Maria for mixed choir a cappella, 1966
Movimientos, ballet, 1968
Correspondencias, 1969
Proâgon, violin and chamber orchestra, 1969–70
Carmen Criaturalisfor horn, vibraphone, cymbal and orchestra 1969-72
Akhtamar, ballet, 1979
El Dr. Brecht in the Colon Theatre, Music Theatre, 1981
Y Cuya luz como la profunda oscuridad it for chamber orchestra, 1982
Bertoldt Brecht at the Salón Dorado, musical theater, 1982–83
Juana, Reina de Castilla y Aragón, hija de los Reyes Católicos, ballet, 1983
Off The Edge ... for baritone solo, string orchestra and tam-tam, 1992–93
Les yeux fertiles for mezzo-soprano, chamber orchestra and percussion, 1998

References

External links
 Alicia Terzian

Argentine classical composers
1934 births
Living people
Women classical composers
Argentine music educators
Argentine women educators
Musicians from Córdoba, Argentina
San Lazzaro degli Armeni alumni
Argentine people of Armenian descent
20th-century classical composers
20th-century Argentine artists
21st-century Argentine artists
Women music educators
20th-century women composers
Argentine women composers